Assicante is a hamlet in the Sussundenga District of Manica Province in central Mozambique. It is situated by the Sussundenga-Dombé road, beside the eastern foothills of the Chimanimani mountain range, and on the verge of Moribane Forest. The language spoken locally is chiNdau.

References

External links
 Assicante on Sussundenga district map

Populated places in Manica Province